This is a list of events related to British television in 1934.

Events

8 January – Radio Times lists this date as the first on which a television programme is broadcast by the BBC. The 30-minute programme, titled Television: By the Baird Process, airs at 11pm.
31 March – The agreement for joint experimental transmissions by the BBC and John Logie Baird's company comes to an end.

Births
 8 January – Roy Kinnear, actor (died 1988)
 14 January – Richard Briers, actor (died 2013)
 20 January – Tom Baker, actor
 12 February – Annette Crosbie, Scottish actor
 17 February – Alan Bates, actor (died 2003)
 24 February – Doreen Sloane, actor (died 1999)
 2 April – Brian Glover, actor and wrestler (died 1997)
 7 April – Ian Richardson, actor (died 2007)
 3 May – Henry Cooper, boxer and Question of Sport team captain (died 2011)
 9 May – Alan Bennett, actor and writer
 15 May – George Roper, comedian (died 2003)
 1 July – Jean Marsh, actress
 5 July – Philip Madoc, actor (died 2012)
 8 July – Marty Feldman, writer, comedian and actor (died 1982)
 8 August – Keith Barron, actor and television presenter (died 2017)
 20 August – Tom Mangold, investigative reporter
 20 October – Timothy West, actor
 9 December – Judi Dench, actress
 28 December – Maggie Smith, actress

See also
 1934 in British music
 1934 in the United Kingdom
 List of British films of 1934

References